Enyinnaya Harcourt Abaribe (born 1 March 1955) is a Nigerian politician who was elected to the Abia-South Senatorial District of Abia State in the Senate of Nigeria in April 2007. 
He holds the title Nwadiohanma Ngwa. Enyinnaya is an outspoken senator often contributing to debates on national issues. He is a member of the major opposition People's Democratic Party, PDP in the Nigerian senate. He is currently the Minority leader in the senate. 

In January 2020, Abaribe during a motion against worsening insecurity in Nigeria, asked President Muhammadu Buhari to resign reminding president Buhari that Nigerians voted him into power in 2015 and renewed his mandate in 2019 to tackle the security situation in the country. Abaribe said Buhari had made a promise while campaigning for the presidency in 2015 that Nigerians should stone him (Buhari) out of government should he fail to improve the security situation in the country. “Nigerians voted a government into power. We are going with stones to stone them now because they have failed", Abaribe's motion in the senate concluded.

Education
Abaribe earned his WASSCE from Government College Umuahia in 1974. He went on to the University of Benin, where he received a bachelor's degree in Economics in 1979 and a Master's degree in Economics in 1982. He lectured at Edo State University from 1982 until 1985.

Business career
From 1985 until 1991, he was SCOA Nigeria's area manager for Southern Nigeria. After that, from 1991 to 1992, he was employed as Nicon's senior manager for investment. From 1993 until 1995 he was the CEO of Integrated Mortgage Co.

Political career

Deputy governorship and gubernatorial run
Abaribe became Abia State's Deputy Governor after Orji Uzor Kalu's 1999 election to the Governorship. The state's House of Assembly impeached the deputy governor twice in 2000 and a third time in 2003; as he was facing his third impeachment, he resigned on March 7, 2003, sending his resignation via DHL so as to have written record of it. The House of Assembly formally voted him out of office several days later, in a move Abaribe called "medicine after death".
He was succeeded as deputy governor by Eric Acho Nwakanma.
Abaribe ran for the governorship on the All Nigeria Peoples Party (ANPP) platform in 2003, but lost to Kalu.

Senatorial career
Abaribe was elected to the national Senate in 2007 on a People's Democratic Party (PDP) ticket; Eric Acho Nwakanma of the PPA challenged the validity of the election.

Abaribe is Vice Chairman of the Senate Committee on Inter-Parliamentary Affairs (Senator Abdulaziz Usman of Jigawa-North East is Chairman). He is also a member of the Committees on the Independent National Electoral Commission, Senate Services, and Works. In October 2007, as Ralph Uwazuruike, leader of the banned secessionist organization Movement for the Actualisation of the Sovereign State of Biafra (MASSOB), was on trial for treason, Abaribe and six other southeastern senators protested at the Federal High Court in Lagos to demand his release.

Abaribe was reelected for Abia South in the April 2011 election.
He is currently the chairman Senate Committee on Media and Publicity

Abaribe was re-elected to the Nigerian 8th senate on the platform of the Peoples Democratic Party in 2015 and is currently representing the people of Abia South Senatorial District in the upper chamber.
On the 13th of June, 2019 he was appointed as the Minority leader of the Senate.

Arrest and release
On June 22, 2018, Abaribe was arrested by the Department of State Security Services (DSS) at his barber shop located at Transcorp Hilton Hotel, Abuja for his alleged links with the Indigenous People Of Biafra (IPOB) being one of the sureties to the IPOB leader Nnamdi Kanu, he was taken to his house for a search and was later taken to the DSS detention in Abuja. He was released the next Tuesday,26 June 2018 on bail.

References

External links

1955 births
Living people
People from Aba, Abia
Igbo politicians
All Nigeria Peoples Party politicians
Peoples Democratic Party members of the Senate (Nigeria)
Nigerian Christians
21st-century Nigerian politicians
Government College Umuahia alumni
University of Benin (Nigeria) alumni